The Men's Long Jump T11 athletics event for the 2016 Summer Paralympics took place at the Rio Olympic Stadium on September 8, 2016. The event is for athletes with the highest level of visual disability. Ricardo Costa won the host nation's first gold medal of the games with a final round leap of 6.52 metres to overtake silver medalist Lex Gillette.

Final

References

Athletics at the 2016 Summer Paralympics